State Route 199 (abbreviated SR 199) is a Secondary state road, located in West Tennessee, and starts at US 45 in the town of Finger in northern McNairy County, and travels southeastward to Leapwood within the same county.

Route description

SR 199 begins in Finger at an intersection with US 45/SR 5. It goes east as a rural 2-lane highway as it passes through town before leaving Finger and turning southeast. It continues to wind its way southeast through rural areas before entering Leapwood, where it comes to an end at an intersection with SR 224.

Major intersections

References
McNairy County Highway Map

199
Transportation in McNairy County, Tennessee